The 1957 Wednesbury by-election was held on 28 February 1957 after the incumbent Labour MP, Stanley Evans, resigned from the House of Commons and the Labour Party after he had refused to vote against the Conservative government on the Suez Crisis. The Labour candidate, John Stonehouse, retained the seat with an increased majority.

Background 
In November 1956 there was a vote of confidence in the Conservative government caused by the Suez Crisis. Evans abstained on the vote, being the only Labour MP not to follow the party whip. Although he was not disciplined by the Parliamentary Labour Party, the Wednesbury Divisional Labour Party were highly critical of him. On 17 November the Divisional Party unanimously passed a resolution calling on him to resign, and on 20 November Evans announced his resignation from both the House of Commons and the Labour Party. He formally resigned his seat by taking the office of Crown Steward and Bailiff of the three Chiltern Hundreds of Stoke, Desborough and Burnham on 26 November.

Candidates 
The resulting by-election was held on 28 February 1957. The Labour Party chose John Stonehouse, a lecturer who had previously unsuccessfully contested two general elections at Twickenham and Burton-upon-Trent. The Conservatives chose Peter Tapsell, a former member of the Conservative Research Department. An independent candidate, Wolverhampton solicitor Michael Wade, announced his candidacy hours before the close of nominations on 18 February.

Result 
Stonehouse held the seat for Labour with an increased majority.

References 

By-elections to the Parliament of the United Kingdom in Staffordshire constituencies
By-elections to the Parliament of the United Kingdom in West Midlands (county) constituencies
Wednesbury by-election
Wednesbury by-election
Wednesbury by-election
20th century in Staffordshire